Arigomphus is a genus of dragonflies of the Gomphidae family.
This group is commonly called the pond clubtails. The species are fairly plain and only the males have the club-shaped abdomen. Unlike other gomphids, they may emerge from artificial ponds. 

The genus is confined to North America. It contains the following species:
Arigomphus cornutus  – horned clubtail
Arigomphus furcifer  – lilypad clubtail
Arigomphus lentulus  – stillwater clubtail
Arigomphus maxwelli  – bayou clubtail
Arigomphus pallidus  – gray-green clubtail
Arigomphus submedianus  – jade clubtail
Arigomphus villosipes  – unicorn clubtail

References

External links
 Arigomphus on BugGuide.Net

Gomphidae
Taxa named by James George Needham
Anisoptera genera